Let Us Prey is the fourth studio album by English doom metal band Electric Wizard. It was released through Rise Above Records in 2002 and was the last album to feature Electric Wizard's original line-up. After its release, Tim Bagshaw and Mark Greening went on to form Ramesses.

The vinyl edition was originally pressed by The Music Cartel on a single LP. Rise Above later reissued the vinyl version as a 2LP with a bonus track, "Mother of Serpents". This track also appears on the Japanese version of the album as well as the CD reissues on both Rise Above and Candlelight Records.

Musical style
Let Us Prey was a continuation of the more abrasive doom metal sound of their previous album, Dopethrone. It featured more experimentation and guitar layering on some songs. It is also unusual because it is much shorter (43 minutes and 51 seconds) than other Electric Wizard albums (with the exception of their eponymous debut album and Wizard Bloody Wizard), and does not include printed lyrics, making them difficult to decipher.

Speaking to Kerrang! in July 2009, Jus Oborn remembered:

Track listing

Original

Bonus song on Japanese version and reissues

Personnel
 Jus Oborn - guitar, vocals
 Tim Bagshaw - bass
 Mark Greening - drums, piano
 Paul Sax - violin on "Night of the Shape"
 Stephen O'Malley - artwork
 All lyrics - Jus Oborn
 All music - Electric Wizard

Release history

References

2002 albums
Electric Wizard albums
Rise Above Records albums
JVC Records albums
Candlelight Records albums